Oldham Central and Royton was a parliamentary constituency centred on the Oldham and Royton areas in the north-west of Greater Manchester, England.  It returned one Member of Parliament (MP)  to the House of Commons of the Parliament of the United Kingdom.

The constituency was created for the 1983 general election, and abolished for the 1997 general election, when it was largely replaced by the new constituency of Oldham West & Royton.

History

Boundaries
The Metropolitan Borough of Oldham wards of Alexandra, Coldhurst, Royton North, Royton South, St James's, St Mary's, St Paul's, and Waterhead.

Members of Parliament

Elections

Elections in the 1980s

Elections in the 1990s

Notes and references

Parliamentary constituencies in North West England (historic)
Constituencies of the Parliament of the United Kingdom established in 1983
Constituencies of the Parliament of the United Kingdom disestablished in 1997
Politics of the Metropolitan Borough of Oldham